Armand Alphonse Paul Emile "Polly" Drouin (January 25, 1916 – January 1, 1968) was a Canadian professional ice hockey player. He was born in Verdun, Quebec.

He played 160 games in the National Hockey League, for the Montreal Canadiens.

References

External links

1916 births
1968 deaths
Canadian ice hockey left wingers
Ice hockey people from Montreal
Montreal Canadiens players
People from Verdun, Quebec